Reinholds Station Trinity Chapel is a historic Sunday School chapel at 114 East Main Street in Reinholds, Pennsylvania, West Cocalico Township, Lancaster County, Pennsylvania.  It was built in 1898, and is a -story, red sandstone building in the Late Gothic Revival style.  It is rectangular and measures 32 feet wide by 52 feet deep.  It has a steeply pitched gable roof topped by a Gothic steeple with belfry and weather vane.  It was built as a Union Sunday School chapel for Lutheran and Reformed congregations.

It was listed on the National Register of Historic Places in 1990.

References

Properties of religious function on the National Register of Historic Places in Pennsylvania
Gothic Revival church buildings in Pennsylvania
Churches completed in 1898
19th-century churches in the United States
Churches in Lancaster County, Pennsylvania
1898 establishments in Pennsylvania
National Register of Historic Places in Lancaster County, Pennsylvania